"Ulysses" is a song by Scottish indie rock band Franz Ferdinand. It was released as the lead single from their third studio album, Tonight: Franz Ferdinand (2009), on 2 December 2008 in the United States and 18 January 2009 in the United Kingdom. "Ulysses" peaked at number 20 on the UK Singles Chart.

Release
The song "Ulysses" was chosen to be the first single and was in physical format on 19 January 2009. It was debuted live on 5 August 2007 at the "Hey You Get Off My Pavement" festival in Glasgow and has been played at every full set gig since. The song received first airplay at BBC Radio 1 on 17 November 2008, and subsequently became available to download from the Canadian and US iTunes music stores on 2 December 2008. In the United States, the song reached #20 on the Billboard Modern Rock Tracks chart, the band's fifth single to appear on that chart. The song also entered the UK Singles Chart at a peak position of #20 on 25 January 2009. The video, directed by Will Lovelace and Dylan Southern, was premiered on 9 January 2009.

The cover art for the single is part of a series of photographs the band are taking on their travels, recreating crime scenes; this one features Alex Kapranos face-down in the street, presumably dead, while his bandmates look on. The Ulysses cover shot was taken in Brooklyn by Guy Eppel.

Reception
"Ulysses" featured on Triple J's Hottest 100 Countdown in 2008, polling 82nd. The track was also featured on the second season of Skins's promo advert.

Ulysses is the Roman name for the Greek mythological hero Odysseus, as well as the title for the novel of the same name by James Joyce.

The song has been used for the television commercial of Toyota Mark X ZiO in Japan since February 2009., as well as the video game Colin McRae: Dirt 2.

Track listing
CD RUG314CD
"Ulysses" - 3:13
"New Kind of Thrill" - 4:28
"Ulysses" (Beyond the Wizard's Sleeve Re-Animation) - 6:13
7" RUG314
"Ulysses" - 3:13
"Anyone in Love" - 2:44
7" RUG314X
"Ulysses" - 3:13
"You Never Go Out Anymore" - 2:05
AUS / German CD 88697459512
"Ulysses" - 3:14
"New Kind Of Thrill" - 4:29
"Anyone In Love" - 2:45
"You Never Go Out Anymore" - 2:06
"Ulysses" (Beyond The Wizard's Sleeve Re-Animation) - 6:13
12" RUG314T
"Ulysses" (Beyond The Wizard's Sleeve Re-Animation) - 6:13
"Feeling Kind Of Anxious" - 6:33
"Ulysses" (Disco Bloodbath Effect) - 8:06
"Ulysses" (Mickey Moonlight Remix) - 3:49
Download RUG314D11
"Ulysses" (Zomby 92 Remix) - 2:21
"Ulysses" (Zomby 8 Bit Rremix) - 3:00

Personnel
 Artwork By - Franz Ferdinand & Matthew Cooper
 Engineer - Alexis Smith, Paul Savage
 Mastered By - Jason Mitchell, John Dent
 Photography - Guy Eppel
 Recorded By, Producer - Dan Carey, Franz Ferdinand
 Songwriter - Franz Ferdinand
 Mastered at Loud Mastering.

Chart performance
"Ulysses" debuted on the Billboard Modern Rock Tracks chart at #20. On the UK Singles Chart, the song debuted at number 20.

Weekly charts

References

2009 singles
Franz Ferdinand (band) songs
Songs written by Alex Kapranos
Songs written by Nick McCarthy
Domino Recording Company singles
2008 songs
Songs written by Bob Hardy (bassist)
Songs written by Paul Thomson